Troubleman Unlimited Records was a record label specializing in indie rock and similar genres.  Founded in 1993, the label was based in Bayonne, New Jersey and owned by Mike Simonetti.

History

The label started as an offshoot of a fanzine called "Wanna Communicate?", releasing 7" singles. The label grew significantly in the 2000s, releasing full-length albums by many groups who are regularly reviewed in media outlets like Spin and Pitchfork.  The label focused on noise rock, including releases from Black Dice, Wolf Eyes and Hair Police. Troubleman Unlimited was named "Best Label" by New York Magazine in 2005.

In the 21st century, Simonetti started a dance label, Italians Do It Better, with Johnny Jewel of Glass Candy.

Band roster
The following artists have made at least one release through Troubleman Unlimited or Italians Do It Better.

The Album Leaf
American Heritage
Black Dice
Blank Dogs
Boris
Bride of No No
Camera Obscura
Chariots (America, North)
Chromatics
Currituck Co.
Death Comet Crew
Desire
Devendra Banhart
Elizabeth Elmore
Enon
Erase Errata
The Fisticuffs Bluff
The Flying Luttenbachers
Glass Candy
Growing

Hair Police
Harvey Milk
Hepatitis Youth
Isis
Jana Hunter
Karp
Kepler
The Lack (Columbus, OH)
Les Georges Leningrad
Lotus Eaters
Measles Mumps Rubella
Meneguar
Merzbow
Milky Wimpshake
Mouthus
Numbers
Nuzzle
One AM Radio
Orthrelm
Robert Nanna
Panthers
Prurient

Pussycat Trash
 The Recoys
Red Monkey
The Red Scare
The Rogers Sisters
Rye Coalition
Sean Na Na
Shotmaker
Tamaryn
Tara Jane O'Neil
The Six Parts Seven
Titus Andronicus
Tracy + The Plastics
Tussle
Unwound
Vegas Martyrs
Versus
The Walkmen
Wolf Eyes
Zola Jesus

See also
 List of record labels
 Mordam Records

References

External links
 Mike Simonetti bio -Support Agency
 Pitchfork interview

American record labels
Experimental music record labels
Indie rock record labels